Caroline "Carrie" Starr Balestier Kipling (December 31, 1862 – December 19, 1939) was the American-born wife of Rudyard Kipling and the custodian of his literary legacy after his death in 1936.

Balestier was born in Rochester, New York, to a prominent local family with a reputation for being unconventional. Her paternal grandfather, whose ancestors were from Martinique, was a founder of the Century Association; her maternal grandfather was E. Peshine Smith, who with Commodore Perry completed commercial negotiations with Japan.

Balestier met Kipling via her brother Wolcott Balestier who had co-authored The Naulahka with Kipling. Balestier had come to London to keep house for her brother and serve as hostess for him. She taught Kipling how to use a typewriter. When Wolcott Balestier died suddenly of typhoid in 1891, Kipling was distraught and spent time with Miss Balestier, proposing to her via telegram and marrying her a week later. The couple were married in London on January 18, 1892. The bride was given away by Henry James who exclaimed "It’s a union of which I don’t forecast the future."

The Kiplings had planned a round-the-world trip for their honeymoon but Kipling's bank failed, causing them to relocate to Balestier's family residence in Brattleboro, Vermont. Once the Kiplings built the family house, Naulakha, Rudyard Kipling would write in an office that could only be accessed via Carrie Kipling's own office, where she would maintain his correspondence and manage the household accounts. The Kiplings left the United States in 1896 after Rudyard Kipling and Caroline's brother Beatty had an altercation over money.

The Kiplings eventually settled in England, in rural Burwash in the country of Sussex. They purchased Bateman's, a grand house that had been built in 1634.
Bateman's was Carrie Kipling's home from 1902 until her death in 1939.

References

External links 

 Rudyard Kipling Papers and other Kipling related collections at The Keep, University of Sussex

1862 births
1939 deaths
Family of Rudyard Kipling
People from Rochester, New York
 American expatriates in England
American people of Martiniquais descent